Friedrich "Fritz" Szepan (2 September 1907 – 14 December 1974) was a German footballer in the period leading up to and including World War II. He spent his entire career with Schalke 04 where he won six national championships and one German Cup. He is commonly regarded as one of the greatest Schalke players of all time. To celebrate the 100th birthday of the club, the supporters voted the Schalker Jahrhundertelf, the "Team of the century": he was included in the midfield. From 1929 to 1938 he played for the Germany national team which he led as captain in 30 matches and during two World Cups.

Usually a highly skilled midfielder, his versatility allowed him to play centre half and as forward. He was not very fast, however he compensated his lack of speed with fantastic intelligence, technique and positional play. Because of his extraordinary game understanding and leadership, he was later known as "Beckenbauer before the war".

Career
Fritz Szepan was born in 1907 in the industrial town of Gelsenkirchen, in a family that came to Gelsenkirchen from the East Prussian Kreis Neidenburg. He joined Schalke 04 as a youth player in 1924 and remained with the side until his retirement in 1950. He first played for the senior side at the age of 17 in 1924. He and his brother-in-law Ernst Kuzorra led Schalke during the era of the team's greatest success in the 1930s when it was the dominant club in Germany. Together they established the famous "Schalker Kreisel" system that used short flat passes to overwhelm their opponent's defence.

Unlike Kuzorra, Szepan also had a successful international career. From 1929 to 1939 he played for the Germany national team which he led as captain in 30 matches and during two World Cups. In 1938, Szepan was named captain of the "Unified Germany" team shortly after the Anschluss. He started out at inside right but gained international recognition in his interpretation of the centre half role. Szepan made the play of Schalke and the German national side at a time when other centre halves were largely committed to covering the opposing centre forward. He however was not an easy-going player and declared his retirement from international play more than once. Szepan had a comeback in late 1936, playing at inside left. His displays again reached the high level of his 1934 World Cup performance and by 1937 Szepan was the outstanding playmaker of the Breslau XI.

After his retirement in 1950, Szepan remained active as coach for Wuppertaler SV, Schalke 04 and Rot-Weiß Essen, leading that club to the German championship in 1955. He served Schalke again as club president from 1964 to 1967. He died on 14 December 1974 in his hometown Gelsenkirchen.

In his 1978 book "Fussball", Helmut Schön characterised Szepan as follows:

"One from the gallery of great playmakers, not markedly pacy, but talented to make the game pacy. He knew how to play directly but also capable of great solos - all that while being strong enough defensively to have played as a stopper. A commander."

Career statistics

Club

International

Trivia
He and fellow Schalke star Ernst Kuzorra married each other's sisters, and thus became brothers-in-law.

References

External links
 
 

1907 births
1974 deaths
German footballers
Germany international footballers
FC Schalke 04 players
1934 FIFA World Cup players
1938 FIFA World Cup players
Sportspeople from Gelsenkirchen
People from the Province of Westphalia
German football managers
FC Schalke 04 managers
Association football forwards
Footballers from North Rhine-Westphalia